Charles Lieb (May 20, 1852 – September 1, 1928) was an American politician who served two terms as a U.S. Representative from Indiana from 1913 to 1917.

Biography 
Born in Flehingen, Germany, Lieb immigrated to the United States in 1868 and settled in Rockport, Indiana.
He attended the public schools, the Rockport Collegiate Institute, and Bryant and Stratton's Business College, Louisville, Kentucky.

He was employed as a bookkeeper and accountant.
He served as a member of the Rockport City Council 1879-1884.
He engaged in the lumber business and as a contractor in 1882.
Lieb served as the Postmaster of Rockport 1893-1897.

Political career 
He served as a member of the Indiana House of Representatives 1907-1913.
He represented Spencer County.

Lieb was elected as a Democrat to the Sixty-third and Sixty-fourth Congresses (March 4, 1913 – March 3, 1917).
He was not a candidate for renomination in 1916, but served as a delegate to the Democratic National Convention in 1916.

Later career and death 
He served as president and director of the Farmers' Bank, Rockport, Indiana and engaged in agricultural pursuits.

He died in Rockport, Indiana, September 1, 1928 and was interred in Sunset Hill Cemetery.

References

External links

1852 births
1928 deaths
People from Rockport, Indiana
People from Karlsruhe (district)
Businesspeople from Indiana
Democratic Party members of the United States House of Representatives from Indiana
Democratic Party members of the Indiana House of Representatives
Indiana city council members
Indiana postmasters
German emigrants to the United States